Ben Gardane Delegation is a delegation (county) of the Medenine Governorate in Southeastern Tunisia.  census it had a population of 79,912, close to the border with Libya.

There has one town (municipality) in the Ben Gardane Delegation, Ben Gardane city.

Geography
The Delegation encompasses the south-easternmost coastal strip, totalling 4732 km² and had a population of 79,912 at the 2014 census. The capital is Ben Gardane city.

Administrative divisions
The Delegation is divided into twelve imadas (with their populations at the 2014 Census):

References

Delegations of Tunisia
Medenine Governorate
Ben Gardane